Noord (Dutch for "North") is the name of several locations:

 Noord, a town in Aruba
 Noord, North Brabant, a hamlet in the Netherlands
 Noord, Rotterdam, a neighbourhood of Rotterdam
 Amsterdam-Noord
 Noord (river), a river in the Netherlands
 Noord, Suriname
 Noord (crater), a crater on Mars